Quarry Hill is a mountain in Greene County, New York. It is located in the Catskill Mountains west of Catskill. Kalkberg is located south of Quarry Hill.

References

Mountains of Greene County, New York
Mountains of New York (state)